Barnard is a historic community located in Cowanshannock Township, Armstrong County, Pennsylvania. It is located at 40.8253427 -79.2297604. It operated a U.S. Post Office from 1861 to 1905. Its elevation is 1,184 feet. Barnards P.O.  appears in the 1876 Atlas of Armstrong County, Pennsylvania.

Sources

 Platt, William G. (1879). Report of Progress in Armstrong County. Harrisburg, PA 
 Pennsylvania Geological Survey, 2nd series, H5, lxvill, 388 p. geol map. scale 1 in.=2 mi.

Populated places in Armstrong County, Pennsylvania